Vaganovo is a rural locality (a village) in Vokhtozhskoye Rural Settlement, Gryazovetsky District, Vologda Oblast, Russia. The population was 17 as of 2002.

Geography 
Vaganovo is located 63 km southeast of Gryazovets (the district's administrative centre) by road. Vokhtoga is the nearest rural locality.

References 

Rural localities in Gryazovetsky District